Petsas list (named after the government spokesman by whom it was published, Stelios Petsas) is the name given to a list of mass media outlets (1232 in total) which received financial reimbursement from the Greek government for promoting the "Stay at Home" ("Μένουμε Σπίτι", Ménoume Spíti) campaign, during the first coronavirus wave in the country.

In total the Mitsotakis government gave out 19,832,132.94 euros. After pressure by the opposition, Petsas, as the government spokesperson, published the list with the amounts. It was pointed out by through journalistic research that less than 1% of the 20 million euros of the campaign were given to outlets opposing the government. For example, Skai received 830,000 euros, Open 450,000, Ta Nea 63,000, I Avgi 10,500, news24/7 75,000 and Iefimerida.gr 250,000. Due to the amounts and the way they were allocated, there were allegations of corruption and lack of pluralism in the media. There were also reactions due to the total exclusion of certain outlets, such as Documento, from the campaign, and the funding of non-existent websites and websites promoting conspiracy theories and pseudoscientific claims. Responding to the criticism towards himself and the government in general for the campaign, Petsas claimed that it was "a campaign which saved lives".

The edict 475ΒΒ/27-10-2020 announced the second Petsas list, this time exclusively for nationwide terrestrial television channels, giving out a total of 2,000,000 euros. This was followed by the promotion of the vaccination campaign, for 18,500,000 euros and the so called Plevris list for a total of 4,960,000 euros.

References 

Mass media in Greece
COVID-19 pandemic in Greece
Political scandals in Greece
2020 in Greece
2021 in Greece